An end-user license agreement or EULA is a legal contract between a software supplier and a customer or end-user, generally made available to the customer via a retailer acting as an intermediary. A EULA specifies in detail the rights and restrictions which apply to the use of the software.

Form contracts for digital services (such as terms of service and privacy policies) were traditionally presented on paper (see shrink-wrap agreement) but are now often presented digitally via browsewrap or clickwrap formats. As the user may not see the agreement until after they have already purchased or engaged with the software, these documents may be contracts of adhesion.

Software companies often make special agreements with large businesses and government entitles that include support contracts and specially drafted warranties.

Many EULAs assert extensive liability limitations. Most commonly, an EULA will attempt to hold harmless the software licensor in the event that the software causes damage to the user's computer or data, but some software also proposes limitations on whether the licensor can be held liable for damage that arises through improper use of the software (for example, incorrectly using tax preparation software and incurring penalties as a result). One case upholding such limitations on consequential damages is M.A. Mortenson Co. v. Timberline Software Corp., et al. Some EULAs also claim restrictions on venue and applicable law in the event that a legal dispute arises.

Some copyright owners use EULAs in an effort to circumvent limitations the applicable copyright law places on their copyrights (such as the limitations in sections 107–122 of the United States Copyright Act), or to expand the scope of control over the work into areas for which copyright protection is denied by law (such as attempting to charge for, regulate or prevent private performances of a work beyond a certain number of performances or beyond a certain period of time). Such EULAs are, in essence, efforts to gain control, by contract, over matters upon which copyright law precludes control.

Comparison with free software licenses

A free software license grants users of that software the rights to use for any purpose, modify and redistribute creative works and software, both of which are forbidden by the defaults of copyright, and generally not granted with proprietary software. These licenses typically include a disclaimer of warranty, but this feature is not unique to free software.
Copyleft licenses also include a key addition provision that must be followed in order to copy or modify the software, that requires the user to provide source code for the work and to distribute their modifications under the same license (or sometimes a compatible one); thus effectively protecting derivative works from losing the original permissions and being used in proprietary programs.

Unlike EULAs, free software licenses do not work as contractual extensions to existing legislation. No agreement between parties is ever held, because a copyright license is simply a declaration of permissions on something that otherwise would be disallowed by default under copyright law.

Shrink-wrap and click-wrap licenses 

The term shrink-wrap license refers colloquially to any software license agreement which is enclosed within a software package and is inaccessible to the customer until after purchase. Typically, the license agreement is printed on paper included inside the boxed software. It may also be presented to the user on-screen during installation, in which case the license is sometimes referred to as a click-wrap license. The inability of the customer to review the license agreement before purchasing the software has caused such licenses to run afoul of legal challenges in some cases.

Whether shrink-wrap licenses are legally binding differs between jurisdictions, though a majority of jurisdictions hold such licenses to be enforceable. At particular issue is the difference in opinion between two US courts in Klocek v. Gateway and Brower v. Gateway. Both cases involved a shrink-wrapped license document provided by the online vendor of a computer system. The terms of the shrink-wrapped license were not provided at the time of purchase, but were rather included with the shipped product as a printed document. The license required the customer to return the product within a limited time frame if the license was not agreed to. In Brower, New York's state appeals court ruled that the terms of the shrink-wrapped license document were enforceable because the customer's assent was evident by its failure to return the merchandise within the 30 days specified by the document. The U.S. District Court of Kansas in Klocek ruled that the contract of sale was complete at the time of the transaction, and the additional shipped terms contained in a document similar to that in Brower did not constitute a contract, because the customer never agreed to them when the contract of sale was completed.

Further, in ProCD v. Zeidenberg, the license was ruled enforceable because it was necessary for the customer to assent to the terms of the agreement by clicking on an "I Agree" button in order to install the software. In Specht v. Netscape Communications Corp., however, the licensee was able to download and install the software without first being required to review and positively assent to the terms of the agreement, and so the license was held to be unenforceable.

Click-wrap license agreements refer to website based contract formation (see iLan Systems, Inc. v. Netscout Service Level Corp.). A common example of this occurs where a user must affirmatively assent to license terms of a website, by clicking "yes" on a pop-up, in order to access website features. This is therefore analogous to shrink-wrap licenses, where a buyer implied agrees to license terms by first removing the software package's shrink-wrap and then utilizing the software itself. In both types of analysis, focus is on the actions of end user and asks whether there is an explicit or implicit acceptance of the additional licensing terms.

Product liability
Most licenses for software sold at retail disclaim (as far as local laws permit) any warranty on the performance of the software and limit liability for any damages to the purchase price of the software. One well-known case which upheld such a disclaimer is Mortenson v. Timberline.

Patent

In addition to the implied exhaustion doctrine, the distributor may include patent licenses along with software.

Reverse engineering
Forms often prohibit users from reverse engineering. This may also serve to make it difficult to develop third-party software which interoperates with the licensed software, thus increasing the value of the publisher's software through decreased customer choice. In the United States, EULA provisions can preempt the reverse engineering rights implied by fair use, c.f. Bowers v. Baystate Technologies.

Some licenses such as the Microsoft .NET Framework redistributable EULA purport to prohibit a user's right to release data on the performance of the software, but this has yet  to be challenged in court.

Enforceability of EULAs in the United States

The enforceability of an EULA depends on several factors, one of them being the court in which the case is heard. Some courts that have addressed the validity of the shrinkwrap license agreements have found some EULAs to be invalid, characterizing them as contracts of adhesion, unconscionable, and/or unacceptable pursuant to the U.C.C.—see, for instance, Step-Saver Data Systems, Inc. v. Wyse Technology, Vault Corp. v. Quaid Software Ltd..  Other courts have determined that the shrinkwrap license agreement is valid and enforceable: see ProCD, Inc. v. Zeidenberg, Microsoft v. Harmony Computers, Novell v. Network Trade Center, and Ariz. Cartridge Remanufacturers Ass'n v. Lexmark Int'l, Inc. may have some bearing as well. No court has ruled on the validity of EULAs generally; decisions are limited to particular provisions and terms.

The 7th Circuit and 8th Circuit subscribe to the "licensed and not sold" argument, while most other circuits do not .  In addition, the contracts' enforceability depends on whether the state has passed the Uniform Computer Information Transactions Act (UCITA) or Anti-UCITA (UCITA Bomb Shelter) laws. In Anti-UCITA states, the Uniform Commercial Code (UCC) has been amended to either specifically define software as a good (thus making it fall under the UCC), or to disallow contracts which specify that the terms of contract are subject to the laws of a state that has passed UCITA.

Recently, publishers have begun to encrypt their software packages to make it impossible for a user to install the software without either agreeing to the license agreement or violating the Digital Millennium Copyright Act (DMCA) and foreign counterparts.

The DMCA specifically provides for reverse engineering of software for interoperability purposes, so there was some controversy as to whether software license agreement clauses which restrict this are enforceable.  The 8th Circuit case of Davidson & Associates v. Jung determined that such clauses are enforceable, following the Federal Circuit decision of Baystate v. Bowers.

Criticism
Jerry Pournelle wrote in 1983, "I've seen no evidence to show that ... Levitical agreements — full of "Thou Shalt Nots" — have any effect on piracy". He gave an example of an EULA that was impossible for a user to comply with, stating "Come on, fellows. No one expects these agreements to be kept". Noting that in practice many companies were more generous to their customers than their EULAs required, Pournelle wondered "Why, then, do they insist on making their customers sign 'agreements' that the customer has no intention of keeping, and which the company knows won't be kept? ... Must we continue making hypocrites out of both publishers and customers?"

One common criticism of end-user license agreements is that they are often far too lengthy for users to devote the time to thoroughly read them. In March 2012, the PayPal end-user license agreement was 36,275 words long and in May 2011 the iTunes agreement was 56 pages long. News sources reporting these findings asserted that the vast majority of users do not read the documents because of their length.

Some critics highlight the hidden privacy implications of end-user license agreements. Many include clauses that allow the computer or device to provide information to third parties on a regular basis without notifying the consumer.

Several companies have parodied this belief that users do not read the end-user-license agreements by adding unusual clauses, knowing that few users will ever read them. As an April Fool's Day joke, Gamestation added a clause stating that users who placed an order on April 1, 2010 agreed to irrevocably give their soul to the company, which 7,500 users agreed to. Although there was a checkbox to exempt out of the "immortal soul" clause, few users checked it and thus Gamestation concluded that 88% of their users did not read the agreement. The program PC Pitstop included a clause in their end-user license agreement stating that anybody who read the clause and contacted the company would receive a monetary reward, but it took four months and over 3,000 software downloads before anybody collected it. During the installation of version 4 of the Advanced Query Tool the installer measured the elapsed time between the appearance and the acceptance of the end-user license agreements to calculate the average reading speed. If the agreements were accepted fast enough a dialog window “congratulated” the users to their absurdly high reading speed of several hundred words per second. South Park parodied this in the episode "HumancentiPad", where Kyle had neglected to read the terms of service for his last iTunes update and therefore inadvertently agreed to have Apple employees experiment upon him.

End-user license agreements have also been criticized for containing terms that impose onerous obligations on consumers. For example, Clickwrapped, a service that rates consumer companies according to how well they respect the rights of users, reports that they increasingly include a term that prevents a user from suing the company in court.

In a 2019 article published by Kevin Litman-Navarro for The New York Times, titled We Read 150 Privacy Policies. They Were an Incomprehensible Disaster, the complexity of 150 terms from popular sites like Facebook, Airbnb, etc. were analyzed and comprehended. As a result, for example, the majority of licenses require college or higher-level degrees: "To be successful in college, people need to understand texts with a score of 1300. People in the professions, like doctors and lawyers, should be able to understand materials with scores of 1440, while ninth graders should understand texts that score above 1050 to be on track for college or a career by the time they graduate. Many privacy policies exceed these standards."

The United Kingdom's National Consumer Council undertook a study published in 2008 which found issues with the way 17 major IT businesses had been using EULA's and asked the Office of Fair Trading to undertake an investigation.

See also
 Abandonware
 Clickwrap license
 Free software license
 Glossary of legal terms in technology
 Good faith (law)
Contra proferentem
 Index of Articles Relating to Terms of Service and Privacy Policies
 License manager
 List of software licenses
 Shrink wrap contract
 Software Asset Management
 Software license
 Terms of service
 Vernor v. Autodesk, Inc.

References

External links
YouTube Video: The Clickwrap and The Biggest Lie on the Internet
 Accessible editorial on enforceability of various EULA-type licenses in the United States from 2002..

Terms of service
Software licenses
Contract law